Blowing a raspberry, strawberry, razzing or making a Bronx cheer, is to make a noise similar to flatulence that may signify derision, real or feigned. It is made by placing the tongue between the lips, or alternately placing the lips against any area of skin, and blowing. When performed against the skin of another person, it is often a form of tickling. 

A raspberry (when used with the tongue) is not used in any human language as a building block of words, apart from jocular exceptions such as the name of the comic-book character Joe Btfsplk. However, the vaguely similar bilabial trill (essentially blowing a raspberry with one's lips) is a regular consonant sound in a few dozen languages scattered around the world. 

Spike Jones and His City Slickers used a "birdaphone" to create this sound on their recording of "Der Fuehrer's Face", repeatedly lambasting Adolf Hitler with: "We'll Heil! (Bronx cheer) Heil! (Bronx cheer) Right in Der Fuehrer's Face!"

In the terminology of phonetics, the raspberry has been described as a voiceless linguolabial trill, transcribed  in the International Phonetic Alphabet, and as a buccal interdental trill, transcribed  in the Extensions to the International Phonetic Alphabet.

Name
The nomenclature varies by country. In most anglophone countries, it is known as a raspberry, which is attested from at least 1890, and which in the United States had been shortened to razz by 1919. In the United States it has also been called a Bronx cheer since at least the early 1920s.

The term "raspberry" derives from the Cockney rhyming slang "raspberry tart" for "fart" (that is, "blowing a fart").

See also
 Golden Raspberry Awards, which are named after the term 
 Linguistic universal
 The Phantom Raspberry Blower of Old London Town
 Flatulence humor

References

Flatulence
Onomatopoeia
Gestures
Articles containing video clips
Sounds by type
Metaphors referring to food and drink